The 2018 Ju-Jitsu World Championship were the 16th edition of the Ju-Jitsu World Championships, and were held in Malmö, Sweden from November 23 to November 25, 2018.

Schedule 
23.11.2018 – Men's and Women's Fighting System, Men's and Women's Jiu-Jitsu (ne-waza), Mixed Duo System – Classic
24.11.2018 – Men's and Women's Fighting System, Men's and Women's Jiu-Jitsu (ne-waza), Men's and Women's Duo System – Classic
25.11.2018 – Men's and Women's and Mixed Duo System – Show, Team event

European Ju-Jitsu

Fighting System

Men's events

Women's events

Duo System

Duo Classic events

Duo Show events

Brazilian Jiu-Jitsu

Men's events

Women's events

Team event
Did not take place.

Links

References

External links
Online results
Official Results (PDF)